Tetranodus copei is a species of beetle in the family Cerambycidae and tribe Tillomorphini. It was described by Chemsak and Linsley in 1988.

References

Tillomorphini
Beetles described in 1988